The Annunciation is a painting by the Italian Renaissance painter Filippo Lippi, finished around 1445–1450. It is housed in the Galleria Doria Pamphilj, Rome.

Differences with other depictions of the Annunciation include the angel's position on the right and the use of a very bright source of light, inspired by works of Filippo Brunelleschi and Beato Angelico. On the top are the hands of God, emerging from the clouds and releasing the dove of the Holy Ghost. The dove descends along a luminous trail running toward the Virgin's shoulder, transmitting the Divine Will through materialized light. 

The architectural framework may be the work of an assistant.

See also
Lippi's Annunciation (Galleria Nazionale d'Arte Antica)
Lippi's Annunciation (Munich)

1450 paintings
Paintings by Filippo Lippi
Collections of the Doria Pamphilj Gallery
Lippi Rome